Battle of Żurawno took place between 25 September and 14 October 1676, during the war Polish-Ottoman War (1672–1676). The battle ended in negotiations for peace; the treaty of Żurawno was signed in its aftermath.

In late August 1676, a large Ottoman-Tatar army of some 50,000 entered the southern Polish province of Pokucie. The invaders were faced by Jan III Sobieski, who had 20,000 soldiers. On 24 September 1676, Polish mounted units clashed with Tatars near Wojnilow and Dolha, and withdrew to the fortified camp in Zurawno.

The Polish camp was protected from two sides by the Dniestr river, while in its front was the Krechowka river. Tatar forces under Selim I Giray concentrated around it by 26 September, while Ottoman units under Ibrahim Shishman arrived there on 28–29 September. The Ottoman forces were hoping that King Sobieski would lead his troops out of the camp, to fight a battle in the open field, but the Poles decided to stay in Zurawno. As a result, a prolonged siege began, initiated by a barrage of the Ottoman artillery, which continued until 5 October 1676. Since Polish losses were high, Sobieski ordered to abandon the first line of defence, along the old redoubt, and occupy the new line, closer to the center of the camp.

The siege of Zurawno continued until 14 October. Ottoman losses were high, and the Poles continued to fight. Although the Poles were running out of food and ammunition, heavy rains put the Ottoman camp at risk of being flooded and the siege that much more difficult. Ibrahim Seytan decided to initiate negotiations. On 14 October a truce was signed, and three days later the Treaty of Zurawno was signed, ending the second phase of the Polish–Ottoman War (1672–76).

In 1876, on the 200th anniversary of the battle, the Polish population of Zurawno founded a commemorative monument.

References 

Conflicts in 1676
Żurawno 1676
Żurawno 1676
1676 in the Polish–Lithuanian Commonwealth
1676 in the Ottoman Empire
Zurawno